The Battle of Aussig or Battle of Ústí nad Labem was fought on 16 June 1426, between Roman Catholic crusaders and the Hussites during the Fourth Crusade of the Hussite Wars. It was fought near Aussig (Ústí nad Labem) in northern Bohemia.

The crusade was called because the Pope believed that the Hussite armies would be easily defeated after the death of Jan Žižka. The overall commander of the Hussite forces at the battle was Sigismund Korybut, while Prokop the Great was independently in command of the Taborites. Boso of Vitzthum was the leader of the crusading army. Medieval chronicles states that Hussites had 24,000 soldiers and at least 500 war wagons, while the crusaders had 36,000 men. However modern historians suggest that these numbers are largely exaggerated.

The Hussites drew up their Wagenburg on one of the hills near the town. A crusader cavalry assault on the wagon fortress began the battle. The knights could have been equipped with very large battle axes or hammers because one account of the battle has them hewing through the retaining chains on the wagons to breach through the fortress and get inside the Wagenburg. Then, the knights broke through a second defensive line that was made up of pavises. This was the highest point of crusader morale in the whole battle. The Hussite cavalry inside the Wagenburg had left and attacked the knights trying to breach the wagon chains from the rear. The knights were then surrounded and fell under a huge barrage of artillery, crossbow, and handgun fire. The Hussites then charged in on the knights and showed no mercy. The actual battle was brief, and for that reason, it is possible that no more than 4,000 soldiers were lost on the crusader side. However, after the battle, many of the crusaders fled to nearby villages.

References

External links
 Battles of the Hussite Wars

Aussig
Aussig
Battles in Bohemia
1426 in Europe
Aussig
1420s in the Holy Roman Empire
Prokop the Great
History of the Ústí nad Labem Region